Thrombospondin type-1 domain-containing protein 1 is a protein that in humans is encoded by the THSD1 gene.

The protein encoded by this gene contains a type 1 thrombospondin domain, which is found in thrombospondin, a number of proteins involved in the complement pathway, as well as extracellular matrix proteins. Alternatively spliced transcript variants encoding distinct isoforms have been observed.

References

Further reading